Jasmine Alkhaldi (born 20 June 1993) is a Filipino swimmer who represented the Philippines in the 2012 Summer Olympics and 2016 Rio. She holds the Philippine women's record in the 200, 100, 50 metre freestyle and 100 metre butterfly and 50 metre butterfly events. At the club level Alkhaldi swims for the Ayala Harpoons.

Early life and education 
Alkhaldi was born in Parañaque to a Filipino mother from Cebu and a Saudi Arabian father. She has a brother and a sister. Alkhaldi attended University of Hawai'i where she graduated in 2016 with a business degree majoring in management and marketing.

Swimming career 
Prior to her participation in the 2012 Summer Olympics in London, Alkhaldi held the Philippines women's record in the 100 metre butterfly and 50 metre butterfly. Her personal best swimming times included the following. In the 2012 Summer Olympics, Alkhaldi swam the 100 metre freestyle in 57.13 seconds, placing 34th out of 50 competitors. She also participated in the 2016 Summer Olympics in Rio de Janeiro.

Alkhaldi has also participated in the Asian Games, particularly in the 2010, 2014, and 2018 editions.

In the 2013 Southeast Asian Games, Alkhaldi swam the 100 metre freestyle in a time of 56.65, winning the gold medal, however, the technical committee annulled the results because of a false start. In the re-swim, she placed third and received bronze with a time of 56.63. She also won the 100 metre butterfly receiving the bronze medal. On the next edition of the regional games held in Singapore in 2015, she swam the 50 metre butterfly in 27.47, 100 metre freestyle in 56.10 and  200 metre freestyle in 2.00.84 where she beat the Philippine National Record also getting three bronze medals in these event. She ranked 4th in 4 × 100 metre freestyle with a time of 3.53.57 with Hannah Dato, Elizabeth Jordana and Roxanne Ashley Yu beating the previous Philippine national record of 3.56.20, clocked last in the 2009 SEA Games in Laos.

In October 2018, she was reportedly aiming to qualify for the 2020 Summer Olympics and preparing for the 2019 Southeast Asian Games. In 2018, she has secured support from private sponsors; from Cecilio Pedro of Hapee in early 2018 and Ever Bilena in 15 October. Alkhaldi as of this time is being trained by Archie Lim of the Ayala Harpoons club and former national coach.

Alkhaldi became the sole Filipino to qualify for the 2018 FINA World Swimming Championships in Hangzhou, China. She qualified by recording a time of 55.54 in the 100-m freestyle finals in the Singapore leg of the 2018 FINA Swimming World Cup in November surpassing the qualifying time of 55.66.

Popularity 
During the 2012 Summer Olympics, Alkhaldi became popular in online Saudi Arabian social networks, because she was a woman of Saudi Arabian origin who competed in the Olympic Games. Sarah Attar and Wojdan Shaherkani were the first women to compete in Olympic competition for Saudi Arabia.

See also

2012 Summer Olympics
List of Filipino athletes

References

External links
 University of Hawai'i Profile

Living people
Filipino female swimmers
Olympic swimmers of the Philippines
Saudi Arabian people of Filipino descent
Swimmers at the 2012 Summer Olympics
Swimmers at the 2016 Summer Olympics
Swimmers at the 2010 Summer Youth Olympics
Filipino people of Saudi Arabian descent
1993 births
Swimmers at the 2010 Asian Games
Swimmers at the 2014 Asian Games
Swimmers at the 2018 Asian Games
People from Parañaque
Sportspeople from Metro Manila
Filipino female butterfly swimmers
Filipino female freestyle swimmers
Southeast Asian Games medalists in swimming
Southeast Asian Games silver medalists for the Philippines
Southeast Asian Games bronze medalists for the Philippines
Hawaii Rainbow Wahine swimmers
Competitors at the 2013 Southeast Asian Games
Competitors at the 2015 Southeast Asian Games
Competitors at the 2017 Southeast Asian Games
Asian Games competitors for the Philippines
Competitors at the 2019 Southeast Asian Games
Filipino female backstroke swimmers
Competitors at the 2021 Southeast Asian Games